Eleonora Mihalca (married name Vlaicov; born 1945), is a female former international table tennis player from Romania.

Table tennis career
She won two silver medals at the World Table Tennis Championships; one in the Corbillon Cup (women's team event) and one in the women's doubles with Maria Alexandru.

She married and later played as Eleonora Vlaicov.

See also
 List of table tennis players
 List of World Table Tennis Championships medalists

References

Romanian female table tennis players
1945 births
Living people
World Table Tennis Championships medalists